Village Cooking Channel is an Indian YouTube Channel, popularly known as VCC. They are known for their videos on traditional village food cooking in open fields. As of Jan 2023, it had 19.3 million subscribers on YouTube and became the first Tamil YouTube channel to receive the first Diamond Creator Award. Several of their videos have more than 80 million views and 'Watermelon Juice' video is the most popular one with 160 million views as on March 2023.

Background
The channel is being run by family members , consisting of brothers  V. Subramanian (the cameraman), V. Ayyanar, V. Murugesan, their cousin T. Muthumanickam, their brother-in-law G. Tamilselvan and are led by their grandfather and former chef  M. Periyathambi. Periyathambi is a well-known caterer in the village of Chinnaveeramangalam, Pudukkottai, Tamil Nadu.

The channel employs the use of traditional vessels and cauldrons to cook a variety of dishes, using traditional methods (no modern equipment is used). After filming the video, the team have their share of food and later , it is served at old-age homes and orphanages in their village.

In January 2021, Rahul Gandhi joined their outdoor cooking for mushroom biryani in Karur, which enhanced the channel's popularity even further. On 4 July 2021, the channel donated 1 Million rupees to Tamilnadu Chief Minister Public Relief Fund for fight against COVID-19 pandemic.

Reception

Accolades
Its unique style has won Black Sheep Digital Award for Best Food Programme in February 2021. They have also won The Behindwoods Gold Best Digital Content Creator award in 2021.

In other media
Owing to their popularity, the members were featured in cameo appearances in Vikram (2022), marking their film debut.

References

External links
 
 

YouTube channels launched in 2018
Indian chefs
Food and cooking YouTube channels